
Gmina Promna is a rural gmina (administrative district) in Białobrzegi County, Masovian Voivodeship, in east-central Poland.

Villages
Gmina Promna contains the villages and settlements of Adamów, Biejków, Biejkowska Wola, Bronisławów, Broniszew, Daltrozów, Domaniewice, Falęcice, Falęcice-Parcela, Falęcice-Wola, Gajówka Jastrzębia, Góry, Helenów, Jadwigów, Karolin, Lekarcice, Lekarcice Nowe, Lekarcice Stare, Lisów, Mała Wieś, Mała Wysoka, Olkowice, Olszamy, Osuchów, Pacew, Pelinów, Piekarty, Piotrów, Pnie, Promna, Promna-Kolonia, Przybyszew, Rykały, Sielce, Stanisławów, Wojciechówka, Wola Branecka and Zbrosza Mała.

Neighbouring gminas
Gmina Promna is bordered by the gminas of Białobrzegi, Goszczyn, Jasieniec, Mogielnica, Warka and Wyśmierzyce.

References
Polish official population figures 2006

Promna
Białobrzegi County